The Australian Club is a private club founded in 1838 and located in Sydney at 165 Macquarie Street. Its membership is men-only and it is the oldest gentlemen's club in the southern hemisphere.

"The Club provides excellent dining facilities, en-suite bedrooms and apartments, a fully equipped gym, and on Level 7 of the building in which the Clubhouse is located, are first rate business facilities which Members and resident guests may access."

Reciprocities with other clubs 
 Melbourne Club (Melbourne)
 Athenaeum Club (Melbourne) 
 The Australian Club (Melbourne)
 Boodle's (London)
 Brooks's (London)
 Garrick Club (London)
 New Club (Edinburgh)
 Knickerbocker Club (New York)
 Union Club (New York)
 Metropolitan Club (Washington D.C.)
 Somerset Club (Boston)
 Pacific-Union Club (San Francisco)
 Circolo della Caccia (Rome)
 Circolo Nazionale dell'Unione (Naples)
 Domino Club (Bologna)
 Circolo Società dell'Unione (Venice) 
 Jockey-Club de Paris (Paris) 
 Jockey Club für Österreich (Vienna)
 Nuevo Club (Madrid)
 * Haagsche Club (The Hague)
 Kildare Street & University Club (Dublin)
 Wellington Club (Wellington)
 Tokyo Club (Tokyo)

Presidents

 Hon Alexander Macleay MLC FLS FRS 1838–1848
 Hon Campbell Drummond Riddell 1848–1856
 Hon Sir Edward Deas-Thomson KCMG CB MLC 1857–1879
 Hon Sir William Macarthur MLC 1879–1882
 Christopher Rolleston CMG 1882–1888
 Edward Merewether FRGS 1888–1893
 Hon Philip Gidley King MLC 1894–1900
 Hon Sir Francis Bathurst Suttor MLC 1900–1908
 Hon Henry Edward Kater MLC 1909–1924
 John Archibald Anderson 1924–1933
 Major-General Hon James William Macarthur-Onslow VD MLC 1933–1936
 William Deuchar Gordon 1936–1939
 Pat Hamilton Osborne 1939–1942
 Hon Sir Colin Sinclair KBE MLC 1942–1945
 Hon Sir Norman William Kater MLC 1945–1948
 Edmund Irving Body 1948–1951
 Hon Sir Colin Sinclair KBE MLC 1951–1954
 John Gordon Crowther 1954–1957
 Edmund Irving Body CBE 1957–1959
 John Gordon Crowther 1959–1960
 Rt Hon Sir Victor Windeyer KBE, CB, DSO, ED, QC 1960–1963
 Donald Brian Hardy Arnott 1963–1966
 Major-General Sir Denzil Macarthur-Onslow CBE DSO ED 1966–1969
 Sir Norman Lethbridge Cowper CBE 1969–1972
 Sir William Morrow DSO ED 1972–1975
 Peter Gordon Sayers 1975–1978
 Graham Marriott Thorp MC 1978–1981
 Louis Walter Davies A0 1981–1984
 Hon Sir John Bryan Munro Fuller 1984–1987
 Alam Hamilton Loxton AM 1987–1990
 Brian Cameron France 1990–1993
 Peter John Watt  1993–1996
 David Hardy Playfair MBE ED 1996–1999
 Robert Lee Maple–Brown AO 1999–2002
 Peter Ross Graham QC 2002–2005
 Roderick Murchison Hume Kater 2005–2008
 Charles Frederick Moore 2008–2011
 Richard Hamilton Fisher AM 2011

Membership

At least 5 former Prime Ministers have been members of the club including recently, John Howard and Malcolm Turnbull.

Women are excluded from membership of the club; although they are welcome as guests in most areas and at most functions hosted by the club. For over a century the club has had a friendly albeit informal relationship with the women-only Queen's Club, where many of the members' mothers, wives and sisters are members. The committees of each club take turns to host the other to a formal dinner on an annual basis.   

In June 2021, around 700 members attended a Special General Meeting of the club to vote on a proposal to allow women to join the club. Seventy-five percent of attending members needed to vote for the proposal in order for it to receive approval. The proposal was defeated when only 38 percent voted in favour of allowing women to join, falling well short of the 75 per cent required.

Website
The club website is titled 165 Macquarie Street but is only accessible to members.

See also
 Australian Club (Melbourne)
 White's
 List of India's gentlemen's clubs
 List of London's Gentleman's clubs

References

External links
 

 The Australian Club Photograph Powerhouse Museum

1838 establishments in Australia
Organizations established in 1838
Organisations based in Sydney
Gentlemen's clubs in Australia
Buildings and structures in Sydney